Generalized game theory is an extension of game theory incorporating social theory concepts such as norm, value, belief, role, social relationship, and institution. The theory was developed by Tom R. Burns, Anna Gomolinska, and Ewa Roszkowska but has not had great influence beyond these immediate associates. The theory seeks to address certain perceived limitations of game theory by formulating a theory of rules and rule complexes and to develop a more robust approach to socio-psychological and sociological phenomena.

Overview 
In generalized game theory, games are conceptualized as rule complexes, which is a set containing rules and/or other rule complexes. However, the rules may be imprecise, inconsistent, and even dynamic. Distinctions in the properties and functions of different types of rules allows the rules themselves to be analyzed in complex ways, and thus the models of the theory more closely represent relationships and institutions investigated in the social sciences.

The ways in which the rules may be changed is developed within the context of generalized game theory based on the principle of rule revision and game restructuring. These types of games are referred to as open games, that is, games which are open to transformation. Games which have specified, fixed players, fixed preference structures, fixed optimization procedures, and fixed action alternatives and outcomes are called closed games (characteristic of most classical game theory models).

Because its premises derive from social theory generalized game theory emphasizes and provides cultural and institutional tools for game conceptualization and analysis, what Granovetter (1985) refers to as the social embeddedness of interaction and social and economic processes. This is in contrast to conceptualization of games consisting of actors which are autonomous utility maximizers. Further, the modeling of the actors themselves in generalized game theory is especially open to the use of concepts such as incomplete information and bounded rationality.

Proponents of generalized game theory have advocated the application of the theory to reconceptualizing individual and collective decision-making, resolutions of the prisoners' dilemma game, agent-based modeling, fuzzy games, conflict resolution procedures, challenging and providing robust and normatively grounded alternatives to Nash equilibrium and Pareto optimality, among others.

Principles

Judgment in generalized game theory
A key aspect of actors decision making in generalized game theory is based on the concept of judgment. Several types of judgment could be relevant, for instance value judgment, factual judgment, and action judgment. In the case of action judgment, the actor seeks to take the course of action offered by the rules of the game which most closely fit the values held by the actor (where the values are a sub-rule complex of the game). 

Predicting how actors will react under these sub-rules is hypothesised to be more accurate than forming traditional game theory complexes. Armstrong (2002) found that when actors hold differing beliefs and roles within a sub-game formal game theory Nash equilibriums became less reliable (it should be noted generalised game theory has received less scrutiny due to lack of notoriety). 

Even the method by which the actor calculates closeness of fit can be controlled by the actors values (such as an actor might use a more speedy algorithm, or a more far-sighted one). Each actor has a judgment operator by which the actor can create a preference order of the perceived qualities of possible outcomes based on satisfying the condition that the qualities of the outcomes can be roughly said to be sufficiently similar to the qualities of the actors primary values or norms. Thus, in generalized game theory, each actor's judgment calculus includes the institutional context of the game.

General game solutions
A general or common game solution is a strategy or interaction order for the agents which satisfies or realizes the relevant norms and values of the players. This should lead to a state that is acceptable by the game players, and is not necessarily a normative equilibrium, but represents the "best result attainable under the circumstances". 

Solutions may be reached through a sequence of proposed alternatives, and when the actors find the ultimate solution acceptable, the proposed solutions may be said to be convergent. Roszkowska and Burns (2005) showed that not every game has a common solution, and that divergent proposals may arise. This may result in a no equilibrium being found, and stems from dropping the assumption for the existence of a Nash equilibrium that the game be finite or that the game have complete information. Another possibility is the existence of a rule which allows a dictator to force an equilibrium. The rules which make up the norms of the game are one way of resolving the problem of choosing between multiple equilibria, such as those arising in the so-called folk theorem.

Generalization 

Generalization in psychological terms is the measure of how a theory holds up when applied in a non-experimental environment. Hence, generalised game theory takes elements from this quality and applies them to game theories. Many traditional Nash equilibriums can be applied to social and psychological interactions through generalization.

When Roszkowska and Burns first discussed the notion of generalised game theory, it stemmed from a need to make game theory more applicable to the real world. Game theory being more useful in describing mathematics and economics than describing psychological phenomena. Traditional notions of best choice and optimal strategy are replaced by consequentialism and instrumental rationality when applied in less abstract contexts, such as the prisoner's dilemma, dictator game and public goods game.

In open environments actors can transform game rules to create “open games”. For example if the actors concur that the consequences of their actions aren’t ideal they may introduce cooperation sub-rules when there is no one adjudicating the scenario. Depending on the differing status and dispositions of the actors, game transformation can occur to form an asymmetric set of rules resulting in a non-optimal outcome. When game theories are generalized, these uncertainty factors are accounted for in the formation of interaction patterns, but role-playing is often required to understand what optimal solutions will result.

Interaction Patterns 
Different observable interaction patterns will create different normative equilibriums.

 In consequentialist-orientated interactions actors will determine their choices based on the expected outcomes, acting in their best interest regardless of the external consequences.
 In normative-orientated interactions actors will have their choices influenced by their values and roles under the context of any sub-rules or societal circumstances.
 Emotional interactions are viewed as irrational under traditional game theory wherein the actors make decisions based on altruism or spite.
 In routine interactions actors resort to habitual modalities and standard learned procedures to make decisions.

Interaction patterns can involve a combination of these to form resulting value judgements for divergent or contradictory outcomes.

Example: prisoner's dilemma
In the example of the two-player prisoner's dilemma, for instance, proponents of generalized game theory are critical of the rational Nash equilibrium wherein both actors defect because rational actors, it is argued, would actually be predisposed to work out coordinating mechanisms in order to achieve optimum outcomes. Although these mechanisms are not usually included in the rules of the game, generalized game theorists argue that they do exist in real life situations. 

This is because there exists in most interaction situations a social relationship between the players characterized by rules and rule complexes. This relationship may be one of, for instance, solidarity (which results in the Pareto optimal outcome), adversary (which results in the Nash equilibrium), or even hierarchy (by which one actor sacrifices their own benefits for the other's good). Some values, such as pure rivalry, are seen as nonstable because both actors would seek asymmetric gain, and thus would need to either transform the game or seek another value to attempt to satisfy. 

If no communication mechanism is given (as is usual in the prisoner's dilemma), the operative social relationship between the actors is based on the actors own beliefs about the other (perhaps as another member of the human race, solidarity will be felt, or perhaps as an adversary). This illustrates the principle of game transformation, which is a key element of the theory.

References

Further reading 
 Thomas Baumgartner, Walter F. Buckley, and Tom R. Burns (1975) "Relational Control: The Human Structuring of Cooperation and Conflict", Journal of Conflict Resolution, Vol. 19: 417-440
 Tom R. Burns and Ewa Roszkowska (2005) "Generalized Game Theory: Assumptions, Principles, and Elaborations," Studies in Logic, Grammar, and Rhetoric, Vol. 8 (21)
 Mark Granovetter (1985). "Economic Action and Social Structure: The Problem of Embeddedness". American Journal of Sociology 91 (3): 481–510.
 Ewa Roszkowska and Tom R. Burns (2002) Fuzzy Judgment in Bargaining Games: Diverse Patterns of Price Determination and Transaction in Buyer-Seller Exchange. Paper presented at the First World Congress of Game Theory, Bilbao, Spain, 2000. available here (MSWord doc).
 Tom R. Burns and Ewa Roszkowska (2007) Multi-value decision-making and games: the perspective of generalized game theory on social and psychological complexity, contradiction, and equilibrium. Advances in Multiple Criteria Decision Making and Human System Management: Knowledge and Wisdom, IOS Press, Amsterdam, 75-107.
 Al I. Subbotin (1984) Generalization of the main equation of differential game theory. Journal of optimization theory and applications, 43(1), 103-133.

Game theory